Luny Tunes Presents: Erre XI is the debut studio album by reggaeton duo Erre XI released on August 12, 2008 by Machete Music. The album includes contributions by Zion & Lennox, Alexis from the duo Alexis & Fido, La Sista, Guelo Star and former Kumbia All Starz member Pee Wee. The album was heavily produced by Luny Tunes. The first single from the album is "Carita Bonita."

Track listing
"Carita Bonita" (featuring Pee Wee) (Luny Tunes, Way Fell & Noriega) - 4:13
"Al Desnudo"1 (Luny Tunes, Nales & Predicador) - 3:10
"La Carta" (Luny Tunes & Noriega) - 3:07
"Invisible" (featuring Zion & Lennox) (Luny Tunes, Noriega & Predicador) - 4:12
"MSN" (Luny Tunes & Mambo Kingz) - 3:06  
"Febrero 14"2 (Luny Tunes, Noriega, Ivy Queen & Tainy) - 3:26
"Lloraré" (Bachata) (featuring Alexis) (Luny Tunes) - 4:09
"Ella Me Amó" (Bachata) (Luny Tunes, Tone & Jery) - 3:42
"Te Hice Volar" (featuring La Sista) (Luny Tunes Thilo & Predicador) - 3:50
"Te Abrazaré" (Scarlito & Thilo) - 3:44 
"Castigo" (featuring Guelo Star) (Luny Tunes & Noriega) - 2:54
"Lloraré" (Balada) (Luny Tunes) - 4:23
"Dímelo" (Luny Tunes & DJ Dicky) - 3:02
"Carita Bonita" (Trance Version) (featuring Pee Wee) (Luny Tunes, Way Fell & Noriega) - 3:04

1Track #2 includes additional vocals by Tito El Bambino.
2Track #6 included additional composition by Ivy Queen.

Chart performance

References

2008 debut albums
Reggaeton albums
Albums produced by Luny Tunes
Albums produced by Noriega
Albums produced by Ivy Queen